Rosa gymnocarpa is a species of rose native to western North America. It is known by the common names dwarf rose, baldhip rose, and wood rose. It grows in shady, damp, and rich forests.

Description
Its stem is covered with long, straight spines which may or may not be abundant.

The pink or white fragrant flowers are flat and open-faced with five petals in most any shade of pink to almost lavender. Its fruit is a red rose hip containing hard tan achenes that contain the seeds. The sepals fall away from the hip earlier than in other species of rose, hence the name baldhip rose.
The leaves are pinnately compound, alternate, with 5 to 9 leaflets, each of which are 1 to 4 cm. Leaflets are elliptic to ovate to round.

See also
 List of Rosa species

References

External links

Jepson Manual Treatment - Rosa gymnocarpa
USDA Plants Profile: Rosa gymnocarpa
Rosa gymnocarpa - Photo gallery of plant, flowers and hips

gymnocarpa
Flora of the West Coast of the United States
Flora of British Columbia
Flora of California
Flora of Idaho
Flora of Montana
Flora of Oregon
Flora of Washington (state)
Flora of the Cascade Range
Flora of the Great Basin
Flora of the Klamath Mountains
Flora of the Sierra Nevada (United States)
Natural history of the California chaparral and woodlands
Natural history of the California Coast Ranges
Natural history of the Peninsular Ranges
Natural history of the San Francisco Bay Area
Bird food plants
Garden plants of North America
Flora without expected TNC conservation status